Tassanapong Muaddarak (born January 12, 1991) is a Thai professional footballer who plays as a defensive midfielder or right back for Thai League 1 club Bangkok United.

Club career

Chiangmai F.C.
In 2020, Tassanapong moved from BG Pathum United to join their satellite team, recently relegated Chiangmai F.C. in Thai League 2. Served as a vice captain, he appeared in 25 league games that season, helping The Lanna Tigers finished seventh in the league.

Nongbua Pitchaya
Despite new contract extension with Chiangmai two months prior, Tassanapong joined the newly-promoted Nongbua Pitchaya on a loan contract for the 2021–22 Thai League 1 season. On 15 January 2022, he scored his first and only goal for the team, an 88th minute header in a 3-2 Thai League 1 home victory against Chonburi F.C. He was a key player in midfield for the north Isan side, starting in 27 from 30 games in the league, helping them finished sixth on their first-ever season on the top flight.

Bangkok United
On 17 June 2022, Tassanapong joined Bangkok United, reuniting with Aurelio Vidmar whom he worked with at Bangkok Glass F.C.

References

External links

1991 births
Living people
Tassanapong Muaddarak
Tassanapong Muaddarak
Association football midfielders
Tassanapong Muaddarak
Tassanapong Muaddarak
Tassanapong Muaddarak
Tassanapong Muaddarak